Then: The Earlier Years is a double album compilation by the band They Might Be Giants, released in 1997 (see 1997 in music). Then contains the album Lincoln in its entirety, the albums They Might Be Giants and Miscellaneous T which are each missing one track, a few otherwise unreleased songs from their 1985 Demo Tape and other songs previously unreleased. The song missing from Miscellaneous T is "(She Was a) Hotel Detective (Single Mix)" and the song missing from They Might Be Giants is the album version of "Don't Let's Start", as it was replaced in its appropriate place in the track listing by the single version of the same song from Miscellaneous T. 

The They Might Be Giants Online Store also sells the non They Might Be Giants and Lincoln tracks separately, in two parts titled Giants Jubilee and Mightathon. These albums were once sold separately, but the full album is typically available for sale digitally.

The compilation Best of the Early Years is effectively a heavily condensed version of this release (a single disc and only 10 tracks).

The two discs of this compilation were released separately in 2013 by Australian indie label Breakaway Recordings, with the TMBG disc having the original "Don't Let's Start" mix and the single mix of "(She Was A) Hotel Detective" added, as well as having "Untitled" moved from track 23 to track 38 and "'85 Radio Special Thank You" having 20 seconds of silence appended.

The cover art is by Tony Millionaire.

Song origins
Tracks 1-3 and 5-19 on disc one are originally from They Might Be Giants
Tracks 1-18 on disc two are originally from Lincoln
Track 4, the single mix of "Don't Let's Start," was taken from Miscellaneous T; in the original release of They Might Be Giants, a different mix of this song appeared as the fourth track on the album
Tracks 20-27 on disc one and tracks 19-26 on disc two are from Miscellaneous T, although that itself was a compilation of b-sides, so the tracks originally appeared on various singles and EPs
Tracks 34 and 35 from disc one and tracks 31 and 32 from disc two are originally from the 1985 Demo Tape
Tracks 28-33 and 36 on disc one and tracks 27-30 and 33-36 on disc two are previously unreleased.

Track listing
All songs are by They Might Be Giants unless otherwise noted.

Disc one
 "Everything Right Is Wrong Again" – 2:20
 "Put Your Hand Inside the Puppet Head" – 2:12
 "Number Three" – 1:27
 "Don't Let's Start" (Single Mix) – 2:35
 "Hide Away Folk Family" – 3:21
 "32 Footsteps" – 1:36
 "Toddler Hiway" – :25
 "Rabid Child" – 1:31
 "Nothing's Gonna Change My Clothes"  – 1:58
 "(She Was A) Hotel Detective" – 2:10
 "She's an Angel" – 2:37
 "Youth Culture Killed My Dog" – 2:51
 "Boat of Car" – 1:15
 "Absolutely Bill's Mood" – 2:38
 "Chess Piece Face" – 1:21
 "I Hope That I Get Old Before I Die" – 1:58
 "Alienation's for the Rich" – 2:25
 "The Day" – 1:27
 "Rhythm Section Want Ad" – 2:22
 "We're the Replacements" – 1:50
 "When It Rains It Snows" – 1:33
 "The Famous Polka" – 1:33
 "Untitled" - 2:33
 "For Science" – 1:19
 "The Biggest One" – 1:22
 "Kiss Me, Son of God" (Alternate Version) – 1:49
 "Mr. Klaw" – 1:19
 "Critic Intro" – 1:37
 "Now That I Have Everything" – 2:20
 "Mainstream U.S.A." – 1:15
 "Fake Out in Buenos Aires" – 1:48
 "Greek #3" – 1:29
 "I Hope That I Get Old Before I Die" (Original Version) – 1:12
 "I'm Def" – 1:08
 "Don't Let's Start" (Demo Version) – 1:14
 "'85 Radio Special Thank You" – 1:25

Disc two
 "Ana Ng" – 3:23
 "Cowtown" – 2:21
 "Lie Still, Little Bottle" – 2:06
 "Purple Toupee" – 2:40
 "Cage & Aquarium" – 1:10
 "Where Your Eyes Don't Go" – 3:06
 "Piece of Dirt" – 2:00
 "Mr. Me" – 1:52
 "Pencil Rain" – 2:42
 "The World's Address" – 2:24
 "I've Got a Match" – 2:36
 "Santa's Beard" – 1:55
 "You'll Miss Me" – 1:53
 "They'll Need a Crane" – 2:33
 "Shoehorn With Teeth" – 1:13
 "Stand on Your Own Head" – 1:16
 "Snowball in Hell" – 2:31
 "Kiss Me, Son of God" – 1:54
 "Hello Radio" – 0:55
 "It's Not My Birthday" – 1:52
 "I'll Sink Manhattan" – 2:32
 "Nightgown of the Sullen Moon" – 1:59
 "World's Address" (Joshua Fried Remix) – 5:42
 "Hey, Mr. DJ, I Thought You Said We Had a Deal" – 3:48
 "Lady Is A Tramp" (Rodgers and Hart) – 1:20
 "Birds Fly" – 1:25
 "Kitten Intro" – 1:43
 "Weep Day" – 1:50
 "The Big Big Whoredom" – 1:39
 "I'm Gettin' Sentimental Over You" (Bassman, Washington) – 1:59
 "Become a Robot" – 1:18
 "Which Describes How You're Feeling" – 1:24
 "Swing Is a Word" – 0:53
 "Doris Cunningham" – 0:12
 "Counterfeit Fake" – 0:39
 "Schoolchildren Singing "Particle Man"" – 2:05

References

External links
Then: The Earlier Years at This Might Be A Wiki

They Might Be Giants compilation albums
1997 compilation albums
Restless Records compilation albums
Rykodisc compilation albums